Acetoanaerobium is a genus in the family of Peptostreptococcaceae.

Etymology
The name Acetoanaerobium derives from the Latin noun acetum, vinegar; Greek prefix an (ἄν), not; Greek noun aer, aeros (ἀήρ, ἀέρος), air; Greek noun bios (βίος), life; New Latin neuter gender noun Acetoanaerobium, vinegar anaerobe.

References

Bacteria genera
Peptostreptococcaceae
Taxa described in 1985